National Tertiary Route 902, or just Route 902 (or ) is a National Road Route of Costa Rica, located in the Guanacaste province.

Description
In Guanacaste province the route covers Nandayure canton (Carmona, Zapotal districts), Hojancha canton (Hojancha, Monte Romo districts).

References

Highways in Costa Rica